Pak Myong-hun (born 20 September 1964) is a North Korean former footballer. He represented North Korea on at least one occasion in 1993.

Career statistics

International

References

1964 births
Living people
North Korean footballers
North Korea international footballers
Association footballers not categorized by position